"Good Man in Storm" is a song released in 1985 by the British musical group Level 42, on their sixth studio album World Machine.

The song alludes to the childhood of both Boon and Phil Gould. In the song, written by Phil Gould, he states (probably to his mother), "There was a vision, flashing by, of a summer's day I spent with you, with a child who never learnt how to cry."

Musicians
Mark King – Vocals, Bass,
Mike Lindup – Vocals, Keyboards
Phil Gould- Drums
Boon Gould – Guitars
Featuring:
Wally Badarou – Synclavier, Additional Vocals
Gary Barnacle – Saxophone

External links
 'World Machine' review

1985 songs
Level 42 songs
Songs written by Phil Gould (musician)